Jason Edwards ( 1969 – 14 March 2022) was an Australian professional rugby league footballer who played in the 1990s. He played for the Newcastle Knights from 1991 to 1992. He played for Country Origin in 1990. Edwards died on 14 March 2022, at the age of 52.

References

External links
http://www.rugbyleagueproject.org/players/jason-edwards/summary.html

20th-century births
2022 deaths
Year of birth missing
Place of birth missing
Australian rugby league players
Country New South Wales Origin rugby league team players
Indigenous Australian rugby league players
Newcastle Knights players
Rugby league wingers